Nicholas de Hunt was the member of Parliament for Coventry in 1346. He was a merchant.

References 

Members of the Parliament of England for Coventry
English MPs 1346
Year of birth unknown
Year of death unknown
English merchants